James Kimball may refer to:
 James P. Kimball, American metallurgist and geologist
 SS James H. Kimball, a Liberty ship
 Jim Kimball, American punk drummer